Claudia Wolscht (born 13 December 1960) is a German film editor.

Life
Born in Bad Honnef, she studied social pedagogy and in 1986 assisted on the film Metropolis in Cologne. From 1988 to 1992 she gained experience as an assistant film editor and took a course in Avid-Media Composer. She has worked as a film editor for cinema and TV since 1993 on over 35 productions. She lives and works in Cologne.

Awards
She won the 2010 German TV Prize (in the category "Best Multi-Part Work") her work on the series Im Angesicht des Verbrechens, which the following year also won her the Grimme-Preis (Fiction). She also received a 2021 German Television Prize for her work on the historical drama Fabian: Going to the Dogs.

Selected filmography
 1999: Schnee in der Neujahrsnacht
 2001: Tatort: Mördergrube (TV series)
 2001: Tatort: Kindstod
 2002: Tatort: Schützlinge
 2003: Sex Up – Jungs haben’s auch nicht leicht
 2003: Bella Block: Tödliche Nähe
 2003: Mensch Mutter
 2003: Das siebte Foto
 2004: Drechslers zweite Chance
 2006: Wilsberg: Tod auf Rezept (TV series)
 2007: Wilsberg: Miss-Wahl
 2007: Ich leih’ mir eine Familie
 2007: 
 2008: Das Wunder von Loch Ness
 2010: Im Angesicht des Verbrechens (TV series, 10 episodes)
 2011: Fernes Land
 2011: 
 2012: Rat mal, wer zur Hochzeit kommt
 2014: Nichts für Feiglinge
 2014: Wealthy Corpses: A Crime Story from Starnberg
 2015: Tatort: Hydra
 2016: Am Abend aller Tage
 2016: 
 2016: Wolfsland: Tief im Wald
 2016: Hotel Heidelberg: Kramer gegen Kramer
 2016: Hotel Heidelberg: Kommen und Gehen
 2016: Hotel Heidelberg: Tag für Tag
 2018: Hanne
 2019: Marie Brand und der Reiz der Gewalt
 2019: Brecht
 2021: Fabian: Going to the Dogs
 2021: Polizeiruf 110: Bis Mitternacht
 2022: Tatort: Gier und Angst

References 

German film editors
Living people
1960 births
German women film editors